Serdyuki is a rural locality (a khutor) in Butyrskoye Rural Settlement, Repyovsky District, Voronezh Oblast, Russia. The population was 79 as of 2010.

Geography 
Serdyuki is located 5 km south of Repyovka (the district's administrative centre) by road. Butyrki is the nearest rural locality.

References 

Rural localities in Repyovsky District